Laurence Ferreira Barbosa (born 1958) is a French film director and screenwriter. She has directed eleven films since 1983.

Selected filmography
 Modern Life (2000)
 Motus (TV film) (2003)
 Ordo (2004)
 Non (Short film) (2007)
 Dix films pour en parler (Short film) (2007)
 Dying or Feeling Better (2008)

References

External links

1950 births
Living people
French women film directors
French women screenwriters
French screenwriters